Harry Claud Patton (June 29, 1884 – June 9, 1930) was a baseball pitcher. He played one game for the St. Louis Cardinals on August 22, 1910, pitching four innings.

External links

https://web.archive.org/web/20070929103250/http://www.thebaseballpage.com/players/stats/pattoha01
Harry Patton Baseball Stats by Baseball Almanac at www.baseball-almanac.com
Redirect at www.baseballprospectus.com

Major League Baseball pitchers
1884 births
1930 deaths
St. Louis Cardinals players
Baseball players from Illinois
Great Bend Millers players
Omaha Rourkes players
Waterloo Boosters players
Des Moines Boosters players
People from Gillespie, Illinois
Shelbyville Queen Citys players